John X. J. Zhang is a professor at Thayer School of Engineering of Dartmouth College, and an investigator in the Dartmouth-Hitchcock Medical Center. Before joining Dartmouth, he was an associate professor with tenure in the Department of Biomedical Engineering at the University of Texas of Austin (UT Austin). He received his Ph.D. in electrical engineering from Stanford University, California in 2004, and was a research scientist in systems biology at the Massachusetts Institute of Technology (MIT) before joining the faculty at UT Austin in 2005. Zhang is a Fellow of the American Institute for Medical and Biological Engineering (AIMBE), and a recipient of the 2016 NIH Director's Transformative Research Award.

Career 
Zhang's research focuses on exploring bio-inspired nanomaterials, scale-dependent biophysics, and nanofabrication technology. The objectives are to: (1) develop new diagnostic devices and methods to screen rare biomarkers for a range of human disorders; (2) probe complex cellular processes and biological networks critical to whole-body functions in health and disease; and (3) to advance fundamental micro and nanotechnologies. Both multi-scale experimental and theoretical approaches are combined within the lab to investigate fundamental force, flow, and energy processes that lie at the interface of engineering and biomedicine. By favoring this innovative, combinatorial approach, the Zhang research group has become a leader in the development of integrated microfluidic and photonic microsystems (MEMS, micro-electro-mechanical systems), semiconductor chips, and other nanotechnologies to facilitate precision medicine and point-of-care (POC) diagnostics for global health initiatives, as evidenced by the development and validation of:

 Liquid biopsy microchips for the capture and analysis of rare, circulating tumor cells (NIH R01); 
 Flexible nano-confined, thin films for biosensing and implantable energy generation (NIH R01, Facebook, NSF grants);
 Quantum dots-based near-field imaging: NSOM and cellular microarrays (NSF EPDT & IMR grants);
 Patterned plasmonic surfaces on MEMS for biosensors (DARPA Young Faculty Award, NASA);
 Microphotonic imaging scanners and microsystems for early cancer detection (Wallace H. Coulter Early Career Award in Biomedical Engineering, Tate Foundation, NSF SBIR, and National Instruments Medical Device Grant Program); and
 Plasmonic scanning probes for controlled genetic perturbation and imaging (NSF CAREER, NER and CMMI grants).

Zhang has a track record for developing well-funded research programs with significant societal impact, and his research has been sponsored by the NIH, NSF, DARPA, the Wallace H. Coulter Foundation, British Council, and several other agencies and industrial partners. His group has published over 160 peer-reviewed publications, presented over 70 invited seminars worldwide, and filed more than 50 patents (8 US patents and 30+ international patents issued). Several patents were licensed to CardioSepctra, Inc., which was later acquired by Volcano Corporation (NASDAQ:VOLC) for $25 million, and NanoLite Systems, Inc., which he co-founded in 2010 (with $3.3 million seed investment) for developing products designed to diagnose cancer through blood screening, tissue imaging and cell transformations at the point-of-care. In 2013, LifeM Inc. was spanned out of his laboratory to develop flexible pressure sensors (the “X2 sensor”) for catheter applications. These innovative sensors allow for multiple points of blood pressure measurement, leading to reduced surgery risk and operating time. His translational effort won the Medical Device Grant from National Instruments in 2011. In 2012, Dr. Zhang has been recognized as one of the MD+DI's (Medical Device and Diagnostic Industry) “40 Medtech Innovators Under 40”. Recently, Dr. Zhang has been leading the effort championed by Facebook to invent wearable actuators for social touch and to help design the future of tactile communications.

Among his numerous awards, Dr. Zhang received the Wallace H. Coulter Foundation Early Career Award in Biomedical Engineering in 2006 for his innovative research in microphotonic imaging scanners and microsystems for early cancer detection. In 2009, Dr. Zhang received an NSF CAREER award for his cutting-edge research in plasmonic scanning probe design for controlled perturbation and imaging at the sub-cellular level, which has enabled a wide range of molecular dynamics studies in live cells and embryos. In 2010, Dr. Zhang received the DARPA Young Faculty Award for the invention of patterned plasmonic surface on MEMS for lab-on-chip biosensing applications. In 2011, Dr. Zhang received an NIH R01 award to develop advanced opto-microfluidic microchips for circulating tumor cell (CTC) analysis, which has enabled the proactive monitoring of cancer prognosis and early cancer detection. To recognize his accomplishment in research and education,  Zhang was selected to attend the US National Academy of Engineering, Frontiers of Engineering (NAE FOE) program in 2011, the NAE Frontiers of Engineering Education (NAE FOEE) program in 2012, and, subsequently, the NAE China-America Frontiers of Engineering Symposium (CAFOE) in 2013. Zhang was also awarded an NIH Director's Transformative Research Award in 2016 to develop implantable energy-harvesting devices enabled by flexible porous polymer films integrated on multi-stable structures. Dr. Zhang's research has been reported by many technical magazines and public media, and was highlighted in the president's “State of the University” address at the U. of Texas in both 2010 and 2011.

As an active member in his professional community, Zhang has served on numerous international conference organizing committees and editorial boards. He is an associate editor for ASME/IEEE Journal of Microelectromechanical Systems (JMEMS) and six other journals. He also actively serves on scientific review committees for the NIH, NSF, DOE, the Canada Research Chairs Program, Swiss National Science Foundation, and many other international agencies. Zhang has mentored over 30 Ph.D. students and post-doctoral scholars, and published a textbook in biomedical engineering.

Honors and awards 

 Sony Faculty Innovation Award, 2018
Facebook SARA (Sponsored Academic Research Agreement) award, 2017
NIH Transformative Research Award, 2016
 Fellow, American Institute for Medical and Biological Engineering (AIMBE), 2015
 National Academy of Engineering, Frontiers of Engineering Program (FOE 2011, FOEE 2012, US-China FOE, 2013)
 DARPA Young Faculty Award, 2010
 NSF CAREER Award, 2009
 British Council Early Career RXP Award, 2008
 Wallace H. Coulter Foundation Early Career Award in Biomedical Engineering, 2006

Source:

Selected patents 

 Handheld imaging probe (8,767,279)
 Forward-imaging optical coherence tomography (OCT) systems and probes (8,531,676)
 Optically-implemented microsurgery system and approach (8,505,544)
 Uniform transfer of luminescent quantum dots onto a substrate (8,193,010)
 Near-field scanning optical microscope probe having a light emitting diode (7,621,964)
 Mechanically tunable optical-encoded force sensor (7,594,443)

Publications 
 Molecular Sensors and Nanodevices: Principles, Designs and Applications in Biomedical Engineering, John X.J. Zhang, Kazunori Hoshino, Elsevier 2014

Personal life 
Zhang has a son currently attending Stanford University and a daughter attending Harvard University.

External links
 Zhang Research Group

References 

Year of birth missing (living people)
Living people
Engineers from Tianjin
Shanghai Jiao Tong University alumni
University of Maine alumni
Stanford University alumni
Massachusetts Institute of Technology staff
University of Texas at Austin faculty
Dartmouth College faculty
Chinese emigrants to the United States
Fellows of the American Institute for Medical and Biological Engineering